Divya Sripada (born 5 September 1996) is an Indian actress who works in Telugu films. 

She started off her career with the YouTube channel Girl Formula by Chai Bisket.

Filmography

Films

Short films 
Partial Filmography based on hit track.

References

External links 
IMDb

1996 births
Living people
People from Vijayawada